Mogappair (also known as Dr. J. J. Nagar) is a residential neighborhood in north-western Chennai, India. It is located west of the Jawaharlal Nehru Road (Inner Ring Road) and is part of the Ambattur zone (7) of the Greater Chennai Corporation. There are industrial estates to the north and west, namely, Padi and Ambattur.

The abundance of highly reputed schools, specialized hospitals and the recent influx of IT offices in the industrial estates in and around it have catapulted Mogappair into a strategic location for business.

The Mangal Lake in the North Western part of Mogappair is the largest park in this region. A few decades ago, Mogappair was a small village, a part of which is still intact in the south-western part of Mogappair. Mogappair is divided into two parts, namely, Mogappair East and Mogappair West.

Etymology
There was a lake called Mugapeeri, from which the name of the locality was derived. After persistent mispronunciation, the name 'evolved' to its present form (Mogappair). Childless couples visit the temple in the locality and offer their prayers, and it is said that their wishes come true after the visit.The word for people in Tamil is "Makkal" and the fortune to possess anything is described by the word - "Peru". Hence, this place was originally called "Makkal-Peru" meaning "Fortune of begetting children". This name has later undergone linguistic modification to the modern-day name 
"Mogappair". Till date, many couple visit "Shri Santhana Srinivasa Perumal, temple" located in the west of Mogappair praying to be blessed with progeny.

History 
Mogappair in the beginning used to be a forest during the British era. A river used to flow in between the area now called as Eri scheme.

Location
Mogappair is located on SH112 highway between Ambattur and Anna Nagar. Mogappair East and Mogappair West are twin localities which share and complement much of their resources and infrastructures alike. It is well connected by road & rail links.
Located close to Ambattur, all west and east bound trains can be boarded from Ambattur, Pattaravakkam and Korattur. Long distance bus & Indian Railways reservation counters are available in CMBT which is 3  km from Mogappair and Chennai International Airport is around 16  km from here. The nearest Metro Rail Stations are located in Thirumangalam and Koyambedu.

The Chennai bypass road NH4 joins from SH-112 near Ambattur and is Southbound towards Maduravoyal and Perungalathur. An underpass to access NH-4 from Ambattur is open for traffic on SH-112 between Nolambur and Ayappakkam.

Mogappair East was the first to be inhabited followed by Mogappair West and Nolambur.

Transportation
Metropolitan Transport Corporation (MTC) runs passenger buses from Mogappair to major parts of the Chennai City. There are four bus terminals in Mogappair. They are J.J Nagar East, J.J.Nagar West (Mogappair East and Mogappair West), Mogappair Officer's Colony (Elango Nagar) and Mogappair (Mogappair Village). The nearest Metro Rail Station is Thirumangalam and Koyambedu.

Bus transport
Bus is the major mode of transport for the people of Mogappair. The locality is served by a bus terminus on Third Main Road. The terminus was developed by the Local Area Development Fund, including cementing the entire surface, construction of time keeper's office, water facilities and toilets and erecting two 60-foot-high high-mast lamps, one each at the entrance and at the exit. About 50,000 people use these terminus daily, from where about 50 buses on 15 routes are being operated daily, making about 400 trips daily. Mogappair Officer's Colony (Elango Nagar) is located on the Officer's Colony Road near Ambattur Estate Road. The frequency of buses, however, is very low from this terminal. Mogappair has a small bus stand on Venugopal Street between the east and the west bus terminals.

Mogappair East Bus Terminus
The Mogappair East terminus was opened in 1990. Located on Paari Salai and spread over a 1.5-acre area, it operates 21 buses a day, serving about 5,000 commuters daily. It was renovated in 2015 at a cost of  6 million.

Mogappair West bus terminus
The terminus at Mogappair West was renovated in 2012. About 39 buses on 12 routes are being operated daily, with the vehicles making about 280 trips on a daily basis. The terminus serves about 30,000 commuters daily.

Educational institutions

Schools

 Chennai Corporation Primary School, Sector-6, Mugappair West,
 Government High School, Mugappair West (TANK School)
 M G R Adarsh Public Matriculation Higher Secondary School, Mugappair East
 Bethany Nursery and Primary School, Reddy Palayam, Mugappair West.
 Dawn (CBSE) International School, Nolambur
 Ravindra Bharathi Global School (CBSE), Mogappair East
 Priya Matriculation Higher Secondary School, Mogappair West
 DAV Matriculation Higher Secondary School, Mogappair East
 DAV (Girls) Sr. Secondary School (CBSE), Mogappair
 DAV (Boys) Senior Secondary School (CBSE), Mogappair
 Chennai Public school (CBSE), TVS Colony, Anna Nagar West
 Spartan Matriculation Higher Secondary School - Mogappair East
 Spartan Exclusive School - Mogappair East
 The Schram Academy International school (Nolumbur)
 Green Valley Matriculation Higher Secondary School, Mogappair West
 SBIOA Model Matriculation Higher Secondary School, Mogappair Eri scheme
 Shamrock Matriculation Higher Secondary School, Mogappair East
 Vasantham - School for children with intellectual disabilities
 PMR Matriculation Higher Secondary School, Mogappair East
 Leo Matriculation Higher Secondary School
 Government Boys Higher Secondary School - Mogappair East
 Government Girls Higher Secondary School - Mogappair East
 Amutha Matriculation Higher Secondary School - Mogappair West
 Sri Krishnammal Matric Higher Secondary School- Mogappair East
 Velammal Matriculation Higher Secondary School - Mogappair East
 Velammal Matriculation Higher Secondary School - Mogappair West
 Nethrodaya school for visually challenged
 Velammal Matriculation Higher Secondary School - TS Krishna Nagar
 Sri Chaitanya CSBE School Mogappair west

Colleges
 Mar Gregorious College of Arts & Science - Mogappair West
 Thai Moogambigai Dental College and Hospital - Golden George Nagar, Mogappair
 Thai Moogambigai Polytechnic - Golden George Nagar, Mogappair
 MMM College of Nursing - Mogappair West
 MMM Academy Of Medical Sciences - Mogappair West

Art School/ Pre-School
 Eurokids Pre-school Mogappair.
 Kalaikkottam Dance School.
 Mar Gregorious college of arts and science
 EdYou Playschool and Daycare
 Arise 'n' Shine International Preschool

Hospitals

 Birla Ayurveda
Shifa health centre
 Kavitha Clinic - Dr. Sampath, Mugappair West
 Holistic Health Center, Mugappair West
 Denticare (Dr.Gnanaraj BDS., MSAID Australia) Dental & implant Clinic
 Annai Clinic - Dr.Sugirtharaj Samuel, Mugappair West
 GBR Clinic - Fertility Centre
 MMM Hospitals (Madras Medical Mission)
 Frontier Lifeline Hospitals (Dr. K. M. Cherian Heart Foundation)
 Vidhya's Eversmile Dental Clinic
 Trinity dental clinic (Dr.Joseph Anand MDS.) 
 The Dental and Orthodontic Centre ( Dr. Abdur Rafeeq M.D.S.)
 Take Care Hospital
 Srinivas Eye Hospital
 Raj Nursing Home
 Chennai Hospital
 Apollo Hospital (Vanagaram to Amattur Main Road, Ayanambakkam)
 Vasan Eye Care Hospital
 KURINJI Holistic Health Care Center (Siddha, Ayurvedic, Yoga And Naturopathy Center)
 Vishnu Eye Care Clinic
 Raghavi hospital
 Sundaram Medical Foundation
 Pranav Eye Hospital

Local newsletters
Mogappair Talk, Mogappair Mail, Mogappair Times, Town Express and Town News are some of the local newsletters which are bilingual (English and Tamil).

Location in context

References

External links

Neighbourhoods in Chennai